"'Loin Like a Hunting Flame" is the twelfth episode of the first season of the American crime-thriller television series Millennium. It premiered on the Fox network on January 31, 1997. The episode was written by Ted Mann, and directed by David Nutter. "Loin Like a Hunting Flame" featured guest appearances by William Lucking, Hrothgar Mathews and Harriet Sansom Harris.

Forensic profiler Frank Black (Lance Henriksen), a member of the private investigative organisation Millennium Group, joins a fellow Group member to track a killer driven by sexual neuroses and who uses mood-altering drugs to gain control of his victims.

"Loin Like a Hunting Flame" has received mostly negative reviews from critics, with its treatment of female characters being seen as particularly poor. The episode—Nutter's last contribution to the series—contains several literary references, alluding to both Dylan Thomas and Johann Wolfgang von Goethe.

Plot

In Boulder, Colorado, a rave is underway in a nightclub. Pharmacist Art Nesbitt (Hrothgar Mathews) approaches a young couple, offering them drugs. Later, all three of them are in a room elsewhere, with Nesbitt recording the couple having sex. When they finish, he poisons them by injection. Their naked bodies are found the following day in a botanic garden, posed to resemble the story of Adam and Eve. The Millennium Group, a private investigative firm,  despatches offender profilers Frank Black (Lance Henriksen) and Maureen Murphy (Harriet Sansom Harris) to aid the police investigation. Detective Thomas (William Lucking) feels uncomfortable working with Murphy, believing that women do not understand male sex offenders.

Elsewhere, Nesbitt is spying on a swingers' party, and follows two women as they leave to buy more alcohol for the party. He impersonates a police officer and pulls their car over. The next day the women are reported missing by their husbands, and their bodies are found posed in a park. Nesbitt is next seen working in his pharmacy, when another young couple come in to purchase medication in preparation for an exotic honeymoon. Nesbitt instead surreptitiously gives them an MDMA-like drug, suggesting they take it immediately.

Meanwhile, the investigation has found traces of this drug in the other victims, with Black believing that the killer not only has access to it through his occupation but is likely consuming it himself while committing his crimes in order to readily act on his sexual fantasies. Black follows up on this, and investigates Nesbitt's pharmacy. Nesbitt is not working at the time, but Black realizes he must be the killer. He interviews Nesbitt's wife (Barbara Howard), finding that they have not had sex in eighteen years of marriage—however, Nesbitt has recently become interested in trying again.

Later, Detective Thomas tells Black that he really has no problem with Murphy—his true issue with the case is his own past. Having investigated sexual offences in the past, Thomas had found the cases affecting him personally, leaving him unable to have sex with his wife and leading to their divorce.

Black realizes that the killer is trying to experience the sexual encounters he missed out on before his marriage, and that he believes his victims are living the happiest moments of their lives because of his actions. He returns to the Nesbitt home, finding the honeymooning couple locked in a bomb shelter below the house. Black runs upstairs, thinking that Nesbitt will murder his wife, but arrives in time to see him commit suicide by injection instead.

Production

"Loin Like a Hunting Flame" is the second of four episodes of Millennium to have been written by Ted Mann, who had previously written "The Judge", and would go on to write "Powers, Principalities, Thrones and Dominions" and the first-season finale "Paper Dove". The episode was directed by David Nutter, and was his last directing credit for the series, having helmed "Pilot", "Gehenna" and "522666" earlier in the season.

A member of Fox's Standards and Practices department was flown out to the episode's Vancouver, British Columbia filming location. She was asked to watch the episode being produced to ensure that it did not breach any of the network's censorship rules. Several of the scenes that were being produced required quite small spaces during filming, requiring Nutter to record additional coverage on a handheld camera, which he later played back to the Standards and Practices liaison for approval.

The episode's title is taken from a line in the Dylan Thomas poem Ballad of the Long-legged Bait, which was first published in 1946's Deaths and Entrances; while the quotation displayed at the beginning—"Two souls, alas, are housed within my breast"—is taken from Goethe's Faust, a two-part 19th century play by Johann Wolfgang von Goethe. Both literary allusions serve to highlight the secret life of the character of Nesbitt—the first in its subject matter, the second thematically echoing the character's two lives. Several of the cast had previously worked with series creator Chris Carter on his previous series The X-Files—Harriet Sansom Harris had appeared in the first season episode "Eve"; Hrothgar Matthews had played roles in four episodes; and Tyler Labine, who briefly appeared handing out leaflets in the episode's cold open, had made appearances in two episodes of that series.

Broadcast and reception

In Australia, the episode premiered on the Seven Network on July 7, 1997.

"Loin Like a Hunting Flame" received mostly negative reviews from critics. Robert Shearman and Lars Pearson, in their book Wanting to Believe: A Critical Guide to The X-Files, Millennium & The Lone Gunmen, rated the episode two-and-a-half stars out of five, finding Mann's writing to lack tension and imagination. Shearman and Pearson felt that the episode "has good moments, and is at least efficient and watchable", but believed that it "doesn't really deliver anything special, doesn't try to be anything other than average". Bill Gibron, writing for DVD Talk, rated "Loin Like a Hunting Flame" 4 out of 5, describing it as being "handled in a subtle, somber manner". Gibron felt that "the events unfold in this episode evenly and eerily", and it serves as an example of "what could have been done had the show's focus, both literally and metaphysically, remained on crime". Writing for The A.V. Club, Emily VanDerWerff rated the episode an F, calling it "quite possibly one of the worst episodes of television I've ever seen". VanDerWerff felt that the episode's wariness of the 1990s rave subculture was particularly dated. She also felt that "Loin Like a Hunting Flame" served as a prominent example of Millennium "social conservatism", noting that it seems "fairly closed-off from other points-of-view" than that of the character Frank Black.

Footnotes

References

External links
 

Millennium (season 1) episodes
1997 American television episodes
Television episodes directed by David Nutter